The Camp Clover Ranger Station, about two miles west of Williams, Arizona, was built in 1934 by the Civilian Conservation Corps.  It was listed on the U.S. National Register of Historic Places in 1993 for its architecture.  It was designed by the USDA Forest Service in Bungalow/Craftsman style.  It served historically as institutional housing and government office space. 

References

Civilian Conservation Corps in Arizona
United States Forest Service ranger stations
Park buildings and structures on the National Register of Historic Places in Arizona
Government buildings completed in 1934
Buildings and structures in Coconino County, Arizona
1934 establishments in Arizona
National Register of Historic Places in Coconino County, Arizona
Williams, Arizona